The Maria Pia Bridge (in Portuguese Ponte de D. Maria Pia, commonly known as Ponte de Dona Maria Pia) is a railway bridge built in 1877, and attributed to Gustave Eiffel, situated over the Portuguese northern municipalities of Porto and Vila Nova de Gaia. 

Part of the Linha Norte system of the national railway, the wrought iron, double-hinged, crescent arch spans ,  over the Douro River. At the time of its construction, it was the longest single-arch span in the world; today, it is no longer used for rail transport and was replaced by a modern structure in 1991.

History

In 1875, the Royal Portuguese Railway Company announced a competition for a bridge to carry the Lisbon to Porto railway across the river Douro. This was very technically demanding: the river was fast-flowing, its depth could be as much as  during times of flooding and the riverbed was made up of a deep layer of gravel. These factors ruled out the construction of piers in the river, so that the bridge would have to have a central span of 160m (525 ft). At the time the longest bridge span was the 158.5m (520 ft) of the bridge built by James B. Eads over the Mississippi at St Louis. When the project was approved, João Crisóstomo de Abreu e Sousa, member of the Junta Consultiva das Obras Públicas (Consultative Junta for Public Works) considered that the deck should have two tracks.

Gustave Eiffel's design proposal, priced at 965,000 French francs, was the least expensive of the four designs considered, around two thirds of the cost of the nearest competitor. Since the company was relatively inexperienced, a commission was appointed to report on their suitability to undertake the work. Their report was favorable, although it did emphasise the difficulty of the project:

Responsibility for the actual design is difficult to attribute, but it is probable that a large part was played by Théophile Seyrig, Eiffel's business partner, who presented a paper on the bridge to the Société des Ingénieurs Civils in 1878. Eiffel, in his account of the bridge, which accompanied the 1:50 scale model exhibited at the 1878 World's Fair, credited Seyrig, along with Henry de Dion, with work on the calculations and drawings.

Construction started on 5 January 1876, and work on the abutments, piers and approach decking was complete by September. Work then paused due to winter flooding, and the erection of the central arch span was not re-started until March 1877. Construction was completed on 1 October 1877. By 28 October 1877, the platform was mounted and concluded, with the work on the  bridge executed using a complement of 150 workers finishing on 30 October 1878. Tests were performed between 1 and 2 November, leading to the 4 November inauguration by King D. Louis I and Queen Maria Pia of Savoy (the eponym of the bridge).

Between 1897 and 1898 there was some concern by technicians about the integrity of the bridge; its  width, the interruption of principal beams, its lightweight structure resulted in an elastic nature. In 1890, in Ovar, the Oficina de Obras Metálicas (Metal Works Office) existed to support the work to reinforce and repair those structures. Alterations to the deck of the bridge were performed under the initiatives of Xavier Cordeiro in 1900. These were followed between 1901 and 1906 by improvements to the triangular beams were performed by the Oficina of Ovar. Consulting with a specialist in metallic structures (the French engineer Manet Rabut) in 1907, the Oficina concluded that the arch and the works performed on the bridge were sufficient to allow circulation. But, this did not impede further work on the fore- and aft-structural members to make the bridge more accessible and to reinforce the main pillars.

In 1916, a commission was created to study the possibility of a secondary transit between Vila Nova de Gaia and Porto.

By 1928, the bridge was already an obstacle to transit.

In 1948, engineer João de Lemos executed several studies to evaluate the bridge's condition: study of the deck (including structural members); analysis of the continuous beams and the arch's structural supports. The analysis of the stability of the bridge was handled by the Laboratório Nacional de Engenharia Civil (LNEC), that resulted in the injection of cement and repair of the masonry joints and pillars, that connected with metallic structures. At the same time, flaking paint was removed from the structure and issues with corrosion were treated during the work, that included repainting with new metallic paint. These projects resulted from the need to improve the structure for the beginning of CP service across the bridge with improved Series 070 locomotives on 1 November 1950. Following a decade of service, an analytic study in 1966 began to analyze upgrading service to electrical locomotives (Bo'Bo'), leading to the conclusion of the electrification of the Linha Norte. Verification, in loco, determined stressed tests for the structure in 1969.

In 1998, there was a plan to rehabilitate and illuminate the bridge, resulting in the establishment of a tourist train attraction between the Museu dos Transportes and the area that included the wine cellars of Porto, a route that included , using a tunnel formerly closed under the historic centre of Porto.

In 1990, the bridge was classified by the American Society of Civil Engineers as an  International Historic Civil Engineering Landmark. The rail functions were transited in 1991 over the São João Bridge (designed by engineer Edgar Cardoso).

Architecture

The bridge is in an urban cityscape, over the Douro River, connecting the mount of Seminário, in the municipality of Porto, to the Serra do Pilar, in the lightly populated section of the municipality of Vila Nova de Gaia.

It is supported on three pillars in Vila Nova da Gaia and by two pillars in Porto. Two shorter pillars support the arch.

Another innovation was the method of construction used for the central arch. Since it was impossible to use any falsework, the arch was built out from the abutments on either side, their weight being supported by steel cables attached to the top of the piers supporting the deck. The same method was also used to build the decking, temporary tower structures being built above deck level to support the cables. This technique had been previously used by Eads, but its use by Eiffel is a good example of his readiness to use the latest engineering techniques.

The design uses a parabolic arch.

Over the bridge are painted ironwork guardrails over granite masonry.

References

Notes

Sources

External links

 

Truss arch bridges
Bridges completed in 1877
Railway bridges in Portugal
National monuments in Porto District
Historic Civil Engineering Landmarks
Wrought iron bridges
Bridges over the Douro River
Bridges in Porto
Listed bridges in Portugal
1877 establishments in Portugal
Gustave Eiffel's designs